Tomer Or (born September 26, 1978) is an Israeli foil fencer.

Early life 
Or is Jewish, and was born in Haifa, Israel. He earned an LL.B. in Law and Business from the Interdisciplinary Center, in Herzliya, Israel.

Fencing career
Or began fencing at the age of eight, fenced at Hapoel Haifa, in Haifa, Israel, and was coached by Ohad Balva and Haim Hatuel.

Or won the gold medal at the 1998 Junior World Championship in Valencia, Venezuela, and the silver medal in 1994 in Mexico City, Mexico.

He is a 10-time Israel Senior National Champion.  He won gold medals in Senior World Cups in Budapest (2002), Copenhagen (2005), Vancouver (2006), and Havana (2007).

He fenced on behalf of Israel at the 2008 Summer Olympics in Beijing, China, and came in 17th.

At the 2009 World Fencing Championships, he advanced to the third round when his scheduled opponent, Mohammed Hussein Ibrahimi, failed to show up, part of a pattern of Iranians not showing up to face Israelis at the competition.

In 2009, he won the gold medal at the 2009 Maccabiah Games in men's foil.

He came in fifth at the 2014 European Fencing Championships in Strasbourg, France.

Coaching career

Or received his coaching diploma from Wingate Institute for Physical Education and Sport in  Netanya, Israel, in 2005.   He started his coaching career 2005 at the Haifa Fencing Club in Israel. From 2010 he was assistant coach at St John's University in New York City, before he returned to Israel.

References

External links

 
 Tomer Or at the European Fencing Confederation

1978 births
Living people
Israeli male foil fencers
Jewish male foil fencers
Israeli Jews
Olympic fencers of Israel
Fencers at the 2008 Summer Olympics
People from Haifa
Reichman University alumni
Wingate Institute alumni
Maccabiah Games gold medalists for Israel
Maccabiah Games medalists in fencing
Competitors at the 2009 Maccabiah Games
European Games competitors for Israel
Fencers at the 2015 European Games